Heat Wave is a 2009 Canadian drama film directed by Sophie Lorain.

Cast 
 Marie-Thérèse Fortin - Gisèle Couture
 François Arnaud - Yannick Ménard
 Marie Brassard - Marjo

References

External links 

2009 drama films
2009 films
Quebec films
Canadian drama films
2000s French-language films
French-language Canadian films
2000s Canadian films